Gemmuloborsonia neocaledonica is a species of sea snail, a marine gastropod mollusk in the family Turridae.

Description
The length of the shell attains 30.3 mm, its diameter 10.6 mm.

Distribution
This marine species occurs at depths up to 710 m off New Caledonia, the Loyalty Islands and the southern New Hebrides.

References

External links
 Sysoev, Alexander, and Philippe Bouchet. "Taxonomic reevaluation of Gemmuloborsonia Shuto, 1989 (Gastropoda: Conoidea), with a description of new Recent deep-water species." Journal of Molluscan Studies 62.1 (1996): 75-87
 Bouchet, Philippe, et al. "A quarter-century of deep-sea malacological exploration in the South and West Pacific: where do we stand? How far to go." Tropical deep-sea Benthos 25 (2008): 9-40

neocaledonica
Gastropods described in 1996